Nobu Hospitality, LLC is an American company founded by Nobu Matsuhisa, Robert De Niro, and Meir Teper in partnerships with Drew Nieporent as an Operator with Myriad Restaurant Group.

Background 
In 1987, Nobu Matsuhisa moved to Los Angeles and opened the eponymous restaurant Matsuhisa. In 1988, Robert De Niro first visited the restaurant, and thereafter became a regular customer. In 1989, De Niro suggested to Matsuhisa that he open a restaurant in Tribeca, New York City. While Matsuhisa thought De Niro's proposal was attractive, he declined, feeling he should focus on establishing a solid foundation for his Los Angeles restaurant first. De Niro waited until 1994 before he floated the idea to Matsuhisa again, and this time Matsuhisa agreed.

History

Restaurants
In 1994, Matsuhisa, De Niro, restaurateur Drew Nieporent, and investor Meir Teper agreed to a joint venture and on the 17 September 1994, the first Nobu opened its doors. Nobu's famous signature dish is black cod with miso.

By 1997 the first Nobu opened outside of the United States, in London. By 2018, the chain has expanded to 38 restaurants and currently (December 2021) counts 50 restaurants.

Hotels 
The first Nobu Hotel opened inside Caesars Palace, Las Vegas, Nevada in 2013. Two years later, in May 2015, Nobu opened a hotel in the City of Dreams, Manila, Philippines. In October of the same year, the Australian billionaire James Packer bought a stake of 20% of Nobu for US$100 million. By October 2020, the chain had 13 hotels.
In late November 2022, the first Nobu Hotel in the Southeast opened in Atlanta, Georgia.

References 

Japanese cuisine
Japanese culture
Sushi restaurants